Achille Rémy Percheron (25 January 1797 Paris – 1869) was a French entomologist. He listed, in Bibliographie entomologique more than 5 000 authors and 500 anonymous contributions.

Works

With Hippolyte Louis Gory (1800-1852), Monographie des cétoines et genres voisins (J.-B. Baillière, Paris, 1833)
With Félix Édouard Guérin-Méneville (1799–1874), “Genera″ des insectes, ou Exposition détaillée de tous les caractères propres à chacun des genres de cette classe d'animaux (Méquignon-Marvis père et fils, Paris, 1835)
Monographie des passales et des genres qui en ont été séparés (J.-A. Mercklein, Paris, 1835)
Bibliographie entomologique, comprenant l'indication par ordre alphabétique de noms d'auteurs : 1° des ouvrages entomologiques publiés en France et à l'étranger, depuis les temps les plus reculés jusque et y compris l'année 1834 ; 2° des monographies et mémoires contenus dans les recueils, journaux et collections académiques françaises et étrangères... suivie d'une table méthodique et chronologique des matières (deux volumes, J.-B. Baillière, Paris, 1837)
Encyclopédie d'éducation, ou Exposition abrégée et par ordre de matières des sciences, des arts et des métiers... rédigée par une réunion de savants et de praticiens (Méquignon-Marvis père et fils, Paris, 1837)

Sources
Jean Gouillard (2004). Histoire des entomologistes français, 1750–1950. Édition entièrement revue et augmentée. Boubée (Paris) : 287 p.

External links
Gallica Digitised Bibliographie entomologique

French entomologists
1797 births
1869 deaths